Clauser is a surname. Notable people with the surname include:

 Al Clauser (1911–1989), American guitarist, songwriter, and engineer
 John Clauser (born 1942), American physicist
 Suzanne Clauser (1926–2016), American television writer

See also
 Clausen